The Men's 1971 USA Outdoor Track and Field Championships took place between June 25-27 at Hayward Field on the campus of University of Oregon in Eugene, Oregon. The Women's Championships took place at Memorial Stadium on the campus of Bakersfield College in Bakersfield, California.  The meet was organized by the Amateur Athletic Union.  The women's pentathlon took place at Los Alamos, New Mexico on June 12.

This is the meet where John Smith set the still standing world record in the 440 yard dash, an event now essentially discontinued on the international scene.

Results

Men track events

Men field events

Women track events

Women field events

See also
United States Olympic Trials (track and field)

References 

 Results from T&FN
 results

USA Outdoor Track and Field Championships
Usa Outdoor Track And Field Championships, 1971
Track and field
Track and field in Oregon
USA Outdoor Track and Field Championships
USA Outdoor Track and Field Championships
Outdoor Track and Field Championships
Sports competitions in California
Track and field in California
Sports competitions in Oregon